Gerhard Franz Hasel (1935–1994) was a Seventh-day Adventist theologian, and Professor of Old Testament and Biblical Theology as well as Dean of the Seventh-day Adventist Theological Seminary at Andrews University.

Hasel's childhood experiences in Nazi Germany are recounted in the book A Thousand Shall Fall, written by his younger sister, Susi Hasel Mundy.  He married Hilde Schafer, who also survived the war. Gerhard and Hilde had 3 children: Michael, Melissa, and Marlena.  Hasel died in a car accident in Utah in 1994.

He authored Old Testament Theology: Basic Issues in the Current Debate and New Testament Theology: Basic Issues in the Current Debate where he suggests there are ten different methodologies at use in the history of Old Testament Theology. He also wrote a commentary on the book of Amos published by Baker Book House.

He also wrote several non-scholarly books, published by Seventh-day Adventist church publishing houses, on the biblical theology of the Remnant.

Theology and research interests 

Hasel had a research interest in the theme of the remnant. He wrote the "Remnant" article for the International Standard Bible Encyclopedia. His book on the subject is one of just four references listed in the Anchor Bible Dictionary article on the remnant.

Hasel was also known for his conservative views.  Hasel espoused a "high view" of inspiration and was opposed to the use of the "purely" historical-critical method of Biblical scholarship.

See also 

 Seventh-day Adventist Church
 Seventh-day Adventist theology
 Seventh-day Adventist eschatology
 History of the Seventh-day Adventist Church
 28 Fundamental Beliefs
 Questions on Doctrine
 Biblical Research Institute
 Teachings of Ellen G. White
 Inspiration of Ellen G. White
 Prophecy in the Seventh-day Adventist Church
 Investigative judgment
 The Pillars of Adventism
 Second Coming
 Conditional Immortality
 Historicism
 Three Angels' Messages
 Sabbath in Seventh-day Adventism
 Ellen G. White
 Adventist Review
 Adventist
 Seventh-day Adventist Church Pioneers
 Seventh-day Adventist worship
 Last Generation Theology
 Remnant
 Remnant (Seventh-day Adventist belief)
 Andrews University

Works

References

External links 
 Maxwell, C. Mervyn. "Life Sketch: Gerhard F. Hasel 1935-1994". Andrews University Seminary Studies 34:2 (Autumn 1996), pp. 165–168
  by Michael G. Hasel. Andrews University Seminary Studies 34:2 (Autumn 1996), pp. 169–186
 Articles by Hasel and about Hasel, as cataloged in the Seventh-day Adventist Periodical Index (SDAPI)

Seventh-day Adventist religious workers
1935 births
1994 deaths
Seventh-day Adventist theologians
German Seventh-day Adventists
Andrews University faculty
American biblical scholars
Old Testament scholars
People from Springfield, Massachusetts
Road incident deaths in Utah
Seventh-day Adventist biblical scholars